Richwood Township is one of eleven townships in Jersey County, Illinois, United States.  As of the 2010 census, its population was 653 and it contained 302 housing units.

Geography

Cities, towns, villages
 Fieldon

Unincorporated towns
 Reardon
 Reddish
 Spankey

Adjacent townships
 Woodville Township, Greene County (north)
 Kane Township, Greene County (northeast)
 English Township (east)
 Otter Creek Township (southeast)
 Rosedale Township (south)

Cemeteries
The township contains these three cemeteries: Gunterman, Reddish and Reddish-Dunham Ford.

Major highways
  Illinois Route 16
  Illinois Route 100

Rivers
 Illinois River

Demographics

School districts
 Jersey Community Unit School District 100

Political districts
 Illinois's 17th congressional district
 State House District 97
 State Senate District 49

References
 
 United States Census Bureau 2007 TIGER/Line Shapefiles
 United States National Atlas

External links
 City-Data.com
 Illinois State Archives

Townships in Jersey County, Illinois
Townships in Illinois